Dimond Gorge is a gorge on the Fitzroy River, Western Australia, within Mornington Sanctuary.

Features

Fauna
The Short-eared rock-wallaby is a known inhabitant of Dimond Gorge.

River level gauging
The Department of Water maintain an operating gauging station in the gorge and the current river level can be ascertained here

Controversy 
There have been several proposals to dam the Fitzroy River at Dimond Gorge to use as a water source for agriculture in the Kimberley and as a source for Perth.

External links
Australian Wildlife Conservancy
River Level
Omodei's Plan
Omodei Media Release
WA Hansard

Canyons and gorges of Western Australia
Kimberley (Western Australia)